Frank Montgomery Hull (November 3, 1901 – 1982) was an American naturalist who specialized in entomology, especially Diptera.

Works

References

American entomologists
1982 deaths
1901 births
People from Coahoma, Mississippi
Dipterists
Mississippi State University alumni
University of Mississippi faculty
Texas A&M University faculty
New Mexico State University faculty
Ohio State University alumni
Harvard University alumni
Scientists from Mississippi
20th-century American zoologists